Thachadi Prabhakaran (16 November 1936  14 February 2000) was an Indian politician and former Minister of Kerala State.

Biography 
Prabhakaran was a member of Indian National Congress from his younger days and had also served as the D.C.C. President and Kerala PCC Secretary. He was at different times, President, Kerala State Co-operative Coir Marketing Federation, Kerala State Co-operative Bank, Alleppey District Co-operative Bank and Kumaran Asan Memorial High School, Pallana.

He was elected to the Kerala Legislative Assembly from Kayamkulam constituency in 1980, 1982 and 1991 Assembly Elections, and served as the Minister for Finance in 1986 in the Cabinet of K. Karunakaran.

References 

 http://keralaassembly.org/1982/1982104.html
 https://web.archive.org/web/20100108020129/http://www.prd.kerala.gov.in/ministers49_first.htm
 https://web.archive.org/web/20110721181458/http://www.stateofkerala.in/niyamasabha/thachandy%20prabhakaran.php

Members of the Kerala Legislative Assembly
1936 births
2000 deaths
Indian National Congress politicians from Kerala
People from Alappuzha district